The 2003 Fusagasugá City Council election was held on Sunday, 26 October 2003, to elect the first City Council since the 2002 reform (Legislative Act 2002). At stake were all 17 seats in the City Council.

Results

References

Regional elections
2003